Chojorusi (possibly from Aymara for a colored clay used to paint houses) is a mountain in the Vilcanota mountain range in the Andes of Peru, about  high. It is located in the Cusco Region, Quispicanchi Province, Marcapata District. Chojorusi lies southwest of Puicutuni and northwest of Llusca Ritti and Sullulluni.

References

Mountains of Cusco Region
Mountains of Peru